The 2017–18 Országos Bajnokság I (known as the e·on férfi OB I osztályú Országos Bajnokság for sponsorship reasons) was the 112th season of the Országos Bajnokság I, Hungary's premier Water polo league.

Teams

The following 16 clubs compete in the OB I during the 2017–18 season:

Head coaches

Regular season

Group A

Schedule and results
In the table below the home teams are listed on the left and the away teams along the top.

Group B

Schedule and results
In the table below the home teams are listed on the left and the away teams along the top.

Second round

Championship round
The top four teams, from two groups advance from the regular season. Teams start the Championship round with their points from the Regular season.

Schedule and results
Key numbers for pairing determination (number marks position after 14 games)

In the table below the home teams are listed on the left and the away teams along the top.

Relegation round
The bottom four teams, from two groups advance from the regular season. Teams start the Relegation round with their points from the Regular season.

Schedule and results
In the table below the home teams are listed on the left and the away teams along the top.

Final round

1st – 4th placement matches
Semi-finals

Game 1

FTC-PQS Waterpolo won the series 9–0 with points ratio, and advanced to the Finals.

Game 2

Game 3

Szolnoki Dózsa won the series 9–6 with points ratio, and advanced to the Finals.

Finals
Higher ranked team hosted Game 1 and Game 3 plus Game 5 if necessary. The lower ranked hosted Game 2 plus Game 4 if necessary.

FTC-PQS Waterpolo won the Final series 3–2.

Third place
Higher ranked team hosted Game 1 plus Game 3 if necessary. The lower ranked hosted Game 2.

ZF-Eger won the Third place.

5th – 8th Placement matches

Fifth place game (European competition play-off)
Higher ranked team hosted Game 1 plus Game 3 if necessary. The lower ranked hosted Game 2.

Seventh place game
Higher ranked team hosted Game 1 plus Game 3 if necessary. The lower ranked hosted Game 2.

9th – 12th Placement matches

Ninth place game
Higher ranked team hosted Game 1 plus Game 3 if necessary. The lower ranked hosted Game 2.

Eleventh place game
Higher ranked team hosted Game 1 plus Game 3 if necessary. The lower ranked hosted Game 2.

13th – 16th Placement matches

Thirteenth place game
Higher ranked team hosted Game 1 plus Game 3 if necessary. The lower ranked hosted Game 2.

Fifteenth place game (Relegation play-out)
Higher ranked team hosted Game 1 plus Game 3 if necessary. The lower ranked hosted Game 2.

Season statistics

Top goalscorers

Points classification

Top exclusions

Discipline

 Most goals conceded (club): 23
 Szolnoki Dózsa-KÖZGÉP  / Round 5, (Group A)
 Most goals conceded: 30
 Szolnoki Dózsa-KÖZGÉP 23–7 Debreceni VSE / Round 5, (Group A)
 Fewest goals conceded (club): 3
 KSI SE  / Round 4, (Group A)
 Fewest goals conceded: 8
 EBP Tatabánya 4–4 RacioNet Honvéd / Round 14, (Group B)
 Attendance:
 Highest: 1,224 ZF-Eger  / Final (1,3)
 Lowest: 50 KSI SE

Number of teams by counties

Final standing

Awards
Best Goalkeeper:  
Best Field player:

See also
2017 Magyar Kupa (National Cup of Hungary)
2017 Szuperkupa (Super Cup of Hungary)

References

External links
 Hungarian Water Polo Federaration 
 vlv.hu
 vizipolo.hu

Seasons in Hungarian water polo competitions
Hungary
Orszagos Bajnoksag I Men
Orszagos Bajnoksag I Men